Elke Voelker (born April 3, 1968, in Lampertheim, Hesse) is a German organist, church musician and musicologist.

Biography 
Elke Voelker studied organ, church music, German and Roman languages and musicology at the universities of Mannheim, Mainz and Heidelberg. Among her teachers were Leo Krämer, Mathias Breitschaft, Ludwig Finscher.

A scholarship allowed her to study abroad with Wolfgang Rübsam (Chicago), Nicholas Kynaston (London), Michelle Leclerc (Schola Cantorum de Paris), Jean Guillou and Daniel Roth.

1996-2008 Voelker worked as Choir Organist and Cathedral Music Associate at the UNESCO Heritage St. Marys Imperial Cathedral of Speyer. 2009 she was nominated Interims Music Director and Cathedral Organist. Voelker maintains an activ international  concert schedule and teaching career.

She is member of the English Karg-Elert Archive, of the German Gesellschaft der Orgelfreunde (GdO), the American Guild of Organists and Honorary Member of the Associazione Organistica Siciliana. Besides this, she is Founder and Artistic Director of the “Internationaler Orgelherbst Deidesheim” and of the Russian "International Organ Festival Philharmony Perm".

Prizes and awards 
 1995: First Prize and Audience Prize "International Organ Competition Speyer Cathedral"
 1999: Finalist at the "Concours International d'Orgue de la Ville de Paris"; Medaille de la Ville de Paris.
 2001: Scholar of the Rotary International Foundation
 2002: Third Prize "International Organ Competition Erfurt"
 2003 und 2004: Diapason Awards 5 for her recordings Karg-Elert Vol.2 and Vol.3
 2007: Répertoire 9 for Karg-Elert Vol.5; Paul Harris Fellow Medal of Rotary International

Articles 
Voelker published numerous articles in Musik in Gegenwart und Geschichte (Bärenreiter), in ORGAN - Journal für die Orgel (Schott)  and in Lexikon der Orgel (Laaber).

Discography 
 1997: Scherzo, Skizze, Tanz. Motette 
 1999: Sigfrid Karg-Elert: Ultimate Organ Works, Vol.1. Aeolus 
 2002: Sigfrid Karg-Elert: Ultimate Organ Works, Vol.2. Aeolus.
 2003: Noëls d' Orgue du Postromantisme français, Aeolus.
 2004: Sigfrid Karg-Elert: Ultimate Organ Works, Vol.3. Aeolus.
 2006: Sigfrid Karg-Elert: Ultimate Organ Works, Vol.5. Aeolus. (Choralimprovisations Vol. 1 and 2)
 2008. Sigfrid Karg-Elert: Ultimate Organ Works, Vol.4. Aeolus.
 2010: Sigfrid Karg-Elert: Ultimate Organ Works, Vol.6. Aeolus. (Choralimprovisations Vol. 3 and 4)
 2014: Sigfrid Karg-Elert: Ultimate Organ Works, Vol.7. Aeolus. (Choralimprovisations Vol. 5 and 6)
 2014: Sigfrid Karg-Elert: Ultimate Organ Works, Vol.8. Aeolus.
 2017: César Franck: Franck avant César Franck. Aeolus.

References

External links
 Homepage of Elke Voelker
 Elke Voelker USA Management Site

1968 births
Living people
People from Lampertheim
German classical organists
Women organists
Contemporary classical music performers
20th-century German musicians
20th-century classical musicians
20th-century organists
20th-century women musicians
21st-century German musicians
21st-century classical musicians
21st-century organists
21st-century women musicians
Women musicologists
20th-century German musicologists
21st-century German musicologists